The shrike-tyrants are a genus, Agriornis, of birds in the tyrant flycatcher family Tyrannidae. The members of this genus are found in open habitats in western and southern South America, usually at high elevations. They are large and heavy billed by tyrant-flycatcher standards, and include the largest representative of the family, the great shrike-tyrant. These five species all have a dull brownish or greyish plumage. Despite their name any similarity with the shrikes is superficial. Many field guides note their greater (but also superficial) resemblance to thrushes.

Species
The genus contains the following 5 species:

References

Taxonomy articles created by Polbot